The Fielder House is a historic house in Fordyce, Arkansas.  Its oldest portion built in 1875, it is the oldest building in Dallas County, predating Fordyce's founding.  It stands on the south side of US 79B in the west side of the city, and looks today like a single-story central-hall gable-roof structure with a rear shed addition, and a shed-roof porch extending across the front.  The core of the house is a log structure, which is now the west side of the building.  In the 1880s the eastern pen was added, creating a dog trot structure, which was then filled in and enclosed by later additions.  The house is also notable for being the home of the aunt of author Harold Bell Wright, who is said to have written some of his works there.

The house was listed on the National Register of Historic Places in 1983.

See also
National Register of Historic Places listings in Dallas County, Arkansas

References

Houses on the National Register of Historic Places in Arkansas
Houses completed in 1875
Houses in Dallas County, Arkansas
Buildings and structures in Fordyce, Arkansas
National Register of Historic Places in Dallas County, Arkansas